The following article presents a summary of the 1973 football (soccer) season in Brazil, which was the 72nd season of competitive football in the country.

Campeonato Brasileiro Série A

Final Stage

Palmeiras declared as the Campeonato Brasileiro champions.

State championship champions

(1)Santos and Portuguesa shared the São Paulo State Championship title.

Youth competition champions

Other competition champions

Brazilian clubs in international competitions

Brazil national team
The following table lists all the games played by the Brazil national football team in official competitions and friendly matches during 1973.

References

 Brazilian competitions at RSSSF
 1973 Brazil national team matches at RSSSF

 
Seasons in Brazilian football
Brazil